The European Cross Country Championships is an annual international cross country running competition. Organised by the European Athletic Association, it is the area championships for the region and is held in December each year. The championships was inaugurated in 1994 in Alnwick and the venue for the championships changes each year.

Unlike the World Championships for the sport, the European Cross Country Championships consists of six races in age categories, with separate senior, under-23, and junior races for both men and women. There are individual and national team medals awarded in each race. In the team competition, the top three from a team of up to six are scored.

History
The first edition of the competition featured only senior races and 180 athletes took part. Men's and women's junior (under-20) races were introduced at the third edition in 1996 and under-23 races were added to the programme in 2006.

Editions 

 Country and athlete figures for senior races only

Senior

Individual

Medal table
Updated after 2019, including the team rankings for each category and the mixed relay.

Under 23

Medal table

Under 20

Men

Women

Medal table

References

External links 
 
 Historical results from GBR Athletics

 
Cross country running competitions
Cross
Athletics team events
Under-23 athletics competitions
Continental athletics championships